Kadio may refer to:

Kadio, Burkina Faso
Kadio, Togo
Kadio Company Ltd.